The Teacher of Peace Award (previously called the Pope Paul VI Teacher of Peace Award) is a peacemaker award given out annually by Pax Christi USA, a Catholic peace organization, to an individual who has exemplified Pope Paul VI's World Day of Peace message: "To reach peace, teach peace."

Recipients 
 1978 - Dorothy Day
 1980 - Msgr. Paul Hanly Furfey
 1982 - Sr. Mary Evelyn Jegen, SND
 1983 - Eileen Egan and Gordon Zahn
 1984 - Four U.S. missionaries murdered in El Salvador in 1980: Sr. Maura Clarke, Sr. Ita Ford, Sr. Dorothy Kazel and Sr. Jean Donovan
 1986 - Jean Goss and Hildegard Goss-Mayr
 1987 - Archbishop Raymond Hunthausen
 1988 - Fr. Lawrence Jenco
 1989 - Fr. Daniel Berrigan, SJ
 1990 - Sr. Joan Chittister, OSB
 1991 - Bishop Thomas Gumbleton
 1992 - Dom Hélder Câmara
 1993 - Colman McCarthy
 1994 - James and Shelley Douglass
 1995 - Jim and Kathy McGinnis
 1996 - Sr. Helen Prejean, CSJ
 1997 - Fr. Roy Bourgeois, M.M.
 1998 - Kathy Kelly
 1999 - Martin Sheen
 2000 - Sr. Dianna Ortiz, OSU
 2001 - Fr. Louis Vitale, Elizabeth McAlister, and Philip Berrigan
 2002 - Fr. Peter Dougherty
 2003 - William P. Quigley
 2005 - Msgr. Ray East
 2006 - Sr. Mary Lou Kownacki
 2007 - Fr. John S. Rausch, GLMY
 2008 - MJ Park and Jerry Park
 2009 - Bishop Leroy Matthiesen
 2010 - Jim Albertini
 2011 - Colleen Kelly
 2012 - Ruben Garcia
 2013 - Mary Meg McCarthy
2016 - Art Laffin
2021 - Fr Bryan Massingale
2022 - Marie Dennis

2021 nominees 

 Fr. David Hyman, OFM
 Dr. Craig Ford, Jr.
 Fr. John Dear
 Bud Courtney and the New York Catholic Worker
 Sharon and David Halsey-Hoover
 Marie Dennis
 Patti Sills-Trausch
 Fr. Bryan Massingale, Ph.D.
 John August Swanson
 Sr. Ann Scholz, SSND
 Sr. Constance Kozel, RSM
 Frank Cordaro
 Pádraig Ó Tuama
 M. Shawn Copeland, Ph.D.
 Sr. Lynn Marie Welbig, PBVM
 Sr. Norma Pimentel
 Kings Bay Plowshares 7
 Sr. Linda Bessom, SND
 Kim Redigan
 Alvin L. Brooks
 Fr. Frank Kelly
 Brian Terrell
 Fr. Emmanuel Charles McCarthy
 Pat Ferrone
 John and Carrie Schuchardt
 Fr. Frank O’Loughlin
 Frank Breen
 Francisco Cardoso Gomes de Matos
 Carolyn Townes, OFS
 Douglas Kasper
 Fr. Chris Ponnet

See also

Pax Christi International Peace Award
Catholic peace traditions

References

External links
Official webpage
Pax Christi USA

Peace awards
Christian nonviolence